Dassa-Zoumé, also known as Igbo Idaasha or simply Dassa, is a city in central Benin, on the Cotonou-to-Parakou railway and the main north-south highway. It is the capital of Collines Department.

Jama'at Islamique Ahmadiyya Benin built its central mosque (Mosquée Moubarqiue) here in 2010, which has a tall 18-meter minaret, just outside the city on the main road towards Parakou. Jama'at Islamique Ahmadiyya Benin also built a French/English bilingual primary school here, called Ecole Primaire Publique Ahmadiyya.

The indigenous population of Dassa are the Idaasha. They migrated from the Egba subgroup of western Yoruba in present-day Nigeria to settle here. The city is known as a place of pilgrimage; the Virgin Mary is said to have appeared in the Grotte Notre-Dame d'Arigbo, around which a basilica has since been built containing several shrines. The city is also known for its surrounding forests and hills, many of which contain Voodoo shrines.

Dassa is also home to a Yoruba constituent monarchy.

References 

Communes of Benin
Populated places in the Collines Department
Communes in Yorubaland